Savinskoye Urban Settlement is the name of several municipal formations in Russia:
Savinskoye Urban Settlement, a municipal formation which Savinsky Urban-Type Settlement with Jurisdictional Territory in Plesetsky District of Arkhangelsk Oblast is incorporated as
Savinskoye Urban Settlement, a municipal formation which the settlement of Savino in Savinsky District of Ivanovo Oblast is incorporated as

See also
Savinsky (disambiguation)

References

Notes

Sources

